State Route 608 (SR 608) in Fairfax County, Virginia is a secondary state highway which traverses the western portion of the county. Before the Fairfax County Parkway from US 29 to Reston was complete, SR 608 was the main north–south road in western Fairfax County.

Route description 
SR 608 uses two different names: West Ox Road and Frying Pan Road.

West Ox Road

SR 608 starts as West Ox Road at an intersection / interchange with both SR 286 (Fairfax County Parkway) and US 29. This intersection is called by roadstothefuture.com as "The most complex one on the Parkway. Also, topped the list of most accident prone intersections in the county." From its southern origin to approximately the interchange with US 50, West Ox Road is a four to six lane divided highway. For the rest of its length it is a four lane divided highway.

West Ox Road passes SR 7435, Post Forest Drive. This is an entrance to the enclave where the Fairfax County Government Center and its associated offices are. Shortly thereafter it passes SR 7700, Fair Lakes Parkway, which leads into Fair Lakes. A few blocks up on the left is the Fairfax Towne Centre.

West Ox Road then passes over US 50 in an interchange. It passes by Oakton to the east, curves to the west and back to the north, all the while passing by neighborhoods of single-family homes. Just south of the entrance to Reston, West Ox Road intersects with SR 602 (Lawyers Road). There one must head west to stay on SR 608. Otherwise, one ends up on SR 602 and winds up in Reston.

The western portion of West Ox Road is primarily a two lane road. It widens as it approaches an intersection with SR 286 (Fairfax County Parkway), and returns to two lanes after the intersection. It passes by smaller single-family houses and Frying Pan Farm Park, and intersects with SR 657 (Centreville Road), bends to the right and ends at SR 7605 (Copper Ridge Road).

Frying Pan Road
After a gap, SR 608 picks up at the intersection of Frying Pan Road and SR 657 (Centreville Road), passing past an office park with hotels, and ending at an interchange with SR 28 (Sully Road).

History
West Ox Rd is a stretch of the original Ox Rd, first dug by Robert Carter I and the Frying Pan Mining Company in the 1720s atop a gentle ridge, with occasional views of the Bull Run Mountains and Blue Ridge to the west.  It has been in constant use since then and has kept largely the same path.  

West Ox Road was originally the main route between Fairfax and Reston before the Fairfax County Parkway was built. It was much more winding then; at one spot there was a barn about 2 feet from the two-lane roadway, where there was a hairpin turn, and SR 664 (Waples Mill Road) joined West Ox Road at a very sharp angle. Since then, the Virginia Department of Transportation (VDOT) has widened and straightened the road, and the intersection with Waples Mill Road has been re-engineered so that the two roads meet at a right angle. The project to widen and straighten the road was proposed in the 1980s, but did not start until the late 1990s. The most recent part of West Ox Road to be widened was opened in 2008.

Major intersections

References

608 Fairfax
State Route 608
State Route 608